Panacea is a brush-footed butterfly genus found in Central America and South America. It is named after one of Asclepius's daughters Panacea.

Species 
Listed alphabetically:
 Panacea bleuzeni Plantrou & Attal, 1986
 Panacea chalcothea (Bates, 1868)
 Panacea divalis (Bates, 1868)
 Panacea procilla (Hewitson, 1852)
 Panacea prola (Doubleday, [1848])
 Panacea regina (Bates, 1864)

References

External links 

Biblidinae
Nymphalidae of South America
Nymphalidae genera
Taxa named by Frederick DuCane Godman
Taxa named by Osbert Salvin